Halichoeres hartzfeldii, Hartzfeld's wrasse, is a species of salt water wrasse found in the Western Pacific Ocean.

Size

Etymology
The fish is named in honor of German physician Joseph Hartzfeld (1815–1885), the Principal Medical Officer of the Royal Dutch East Indies Army, who collected the type specimen, and whose collections, improved the scientific knowledge of the fish fauna of the Ambon Islands.

References

hartzfeldii
Taxa named by Pieter Bleeker
Fish described in 1852